The 1918 New Mexico gubernatorial election was held on November 5, 1918.

Incumbent Republican Governor Washington Ellsworth Lindsey lost the Republican nomination.

Republican nominee Octaviano Ambrosio Larrazolo defeated Democratic nominee Felix Garcia with 50.50% of the vote.

General election

Candidates
Felix Garcia, Democratic, member of the state tax commission
Octaviano Ambrosio Larrazolo, Republican, Democratic nominee for New Mexico Territory's at-large congressional district in 1906 and 1908
Allen H. Moulton, Socialist

Results

References

1918
New Mexico
Gubernatorial